Pelle Clement (born 19 May 1996) is a Dutch professional footballer who plays as an attacking midfielder for Eredivisie club RKC Waalwijk.

Club career
Clement is a youth exponent from Ajax, whom he joined in 2006 from his youth club Koninklijke HFC. He made his professional debut at Jong Ajax on 8 May 2015 in an Eerste Divisie game against VVV Venlo. He played the full game. His first Eredivisie match was a November 2016 match against NEC.

On 28 June 2017, Clement moved to Reading from Ajax for an undisclosed fee, signing a three-year contract with the EFL Championship club.

On 3 January 2019, Jaap Stam signed Clement for the second time for PEC Zwolle after only featuring for Reading once in the 2018–19 season. In his first game he started and registered an assist as Zwolle beat Feyenoord 3–1.

Clement joined RKC Waalwijk on 5 August 2022, signing a one-year contract.

Career statistics

References

1996 births
Living people
Footballers from Amsterdam
Association football wingers
Dutch footballers
Netherlands youth international footballers
Netherlands under-21 international footballers
Koninklijke HFC players
Jong Ajax players
AFC Ajax players
Reading F.C. players
PEC Zwolle players
RKC Waalwijk players
Eredivisie players
Eerste Divisie players
English Football League players
Dutch expatriate footballers
Expatriate footballers in England
Dutch expatriate sportspeople in England